Zbigniew Łój (4 August 1945 – 3 January 2022) was a Polish field hockey player. He competed in the men's tournament at the 1972 Summer Olympics. He died in Częstochowa on 3 January 2022, at the age of 76.

References

External links
 

1945 births
2022 deaths
Polish male field hockey players
Olympic field hockey players of Poland
Field hockey players at the 1972 Summer Olympics
People from Donaueschingen
Sportspeople from Freiburg (region)